Dorjiin Norolkhoo (born 31 December 1949) is a Mongolian gymnast. She competed in five events at the 1968 Summer Olympics.

References

1949 births
Living people
Mongolian female artistic gymnasts
Olympic gymnasts of Mongolia
Gymnasts at the 1968 Summer Olympics
Sportspeople from Ulaanbaatar
20th-century Mongolian women